The 2013 UEFA Super Cup was the 38th UEFA Super Cup, an annual football match organised by UEFA and contested by the reigning champions of the two main European club competitions, the UEFA Champions League and the UEFA Europa League. In a repeat of the 2012 UEFA Champions League Final, the match featured Bayern Munich, the winners of the 2012–13 UEFA Champions League, and Chelsea, the winners of the 2012–13 UEFA Europa League. Having beaten Bayern in the 2012 Champions League Final, it was Chelsea's second consecutive appearance in the Super Cup. It was played at the Eden Arena in Prague, Czech Republic, on 30 August 2013, and was the first to be held away from the Stade Louis II in Monaco since it became a one-legged match in 1998.

Bayern Munich became the first German team to win the UEFA Super Cup, beating Chelsea on penalties after extra time. It was also the first time the winner of the Super Cup was determined by a penalty shoot-out. Chelsea's defeat made them the first team to lose consecutive Super Cups since Porto in 2004.

Venue
The Eden Arena was announced as the venue of the 2013 UEFA Super Cup on 16 June 2011. It opened in May 2008 on the site of the former Stadion Eden. It is the home stadium of SK Slavia Prague, who play in the Czech First League.

Teams

Background
The match marked the first ever UEFA Super Cup between a pair of consecutive UEFA Champions League winners (Chelsea won the 2011–12 UEFA Champions League, coincidentally defeating Bayern Munich in the final).

The match was the first time since 2004 that both finalists competed without the managers who won their respective UEFA trophies in the previous season, as both Jupp Heynckes and Rafael Benítez left the clubs after the conclusion of the previous season. The new managers, Pep Guardiola and José Mourinho, renewed a rivalry they shared in Spain as managers of Barcelona and Real Madrid respectively. Guardiola had twice won the trophy in his management career, with Barcelona in 2009 and 2011. Mourinho had competed for the trophy only once in 2003 when his Porto entered as UEFA Cup holders and were defeated by Milan. Since then Mourinho had twice won the Champions League but on each occasion left his club immediately afterwards and therefore did not lead them in to the Super Cup.

Ticketing
The international ticket sales phase for the general public ran from 14 June to 5 July 2013. Tickets were available in three price categories: €130, €90, and €50. UEFA also launched a charity ticket auction, with all proceeds going to the Centre for Access to Football in Europe. The two clubs were allocated tickets where fans could apply.

Match

Details

Statistics

See also
2012 UEFA Champions League Final – contested between same teams
Chelsea F.C. in international football competitions
FC Bayern Munich in international football competitions

References

External links
2013 UEFA Super Cup, UEFA.com

2013
2013–14 in European football
2013–14 in Czech football
Sports competitions in Prague
International club association football competitions hosted by the Czech Republic
Uefa Super Cup 2013
Chelsea F.C. matches
2013–14 in German football
2013–14 in English football
UEFA Super Cup 2013
August 2013 sports events in Europe
2010s in Prague